Born on November 2nd 1918 in Tsingtao, China, Sasaki took an in interest in photography after purchasing a Togo camera in 6th grade. He continued to take photos during his military service being stationed at Pyongyang, Manchuria, and Manchukuo before returning to Kobe in 1942. He would work as a photojournalist and freelance photographer before meeting Ihei Kimura in 1951 and would later move to Tokyo as his apprentice in 1960. Sasaki was reportedly told, "You'll go bad if you keep photographing bras. Come over to Tokyo." Accepting Kimura's invitation, he left his photo studio to a friend, sold all his camera gear, and bought a Leica M3. 

As a photojournalist he covered social issues including heroin addiction, gradeschool dropouts, and prostitution.

He began publishing regularly on Asahi Camera in 1966, renowned for his macro work on flowers, insects, and small animals. 256 of his photos were published on the magazine across 23 years with his specialty being newborn life and the process of metamorphosis.

References

Japanese photographers
1918 births
2009 deaths